LÉ Fola (CM12) was a  of the Irish Naval Service.

Launched in 1955 as HMS Blaxton (M1132) for the Royal Navy (RN), the minesweeper was transferred to the Irish Naval Service on 22 February 1971, and renamed after Fóla, a legendary queen of the Tuatha Dé Danann and a poetic name for Ireland.

The minehunter remained in service until 1987, when she was sold for breaking. Irish Naval Service
HMS Blaxton was handed over to the Irish Naval Service on 22 February 1971.

Following her commissioning, Fola in company with Banba, worked up in the Western Mediterranean so that they could complete Harbour Acceptance Trials and Sea Acceptance Trials. On 20 March both ships left the Mediterranean for home, however on the way a storm blew up forcing them to take refuge in Lisbon. The two newest additions to the Navy finally arrived on 29 March 1971, and were used for training and fisheries protection.

Decommissioning and fate
In 1987, Fola'' was decommissioned and sold to Spanish interests for breaking.

References 

1955 ships
Former naval ships of the Republic of Ireland
Ton-class minesweepers of the Irish Naval Service
Ton-class minesweepers of the Royal Navy
Cold War minesweepers of the United Kingdom
Ships built in Southampton
Ships built by John I. Thornycroft & Company